Deer Creek State Park may refer to:

 Deer Creek State Park (Ohio), a state park at Deer Creek Lake in Fayette and Pickaway counties in Ohio, United States
 Deer Creek State Park (Utah), a state park at the Deer Creek Reservoir in western Wasatch County, Utah, United States
 Deer Creek State Park, former name for Rocks State Park in northwestern Hartford County, Maryland, United States